Emamzadeh Esmail (also Romanized as Emāmzādeh Esmā‘īl) is a village in Ahmadabad Rural District, Hasanabad District, Eqlid County, Fars Province, Iran. At the 2006 census, its population was 1,990, in 476 families.

References 

Populated places in Eqlid County